is a 2008 fantasy action role-playing game developed by Gaia and Japan Studio.

Gameplay

Gameplay in Coded Soul revolves around Jay's exploration of the randomly generated dungeons of Idea. You're limited in the amount of time you can spend in the world, with your time limit replenished only by reaching key check points. Along the way, you face off against beasts using an action-oriented battle system. The game also has the Okada staples like a weapon and item synthesis system and a "Karma" system through which you make your monsters learn new skills.

Plot

An army has been conducting research into Monolith Gate, the door to the world of ‘Idea’. That door is controlled by Gale, a young boy who gives Jay, a soldier special power to travel to the other side to save his girlfriend, May. The special power grants the ability to control monsters by sucking up their souls. Once you've defeated a foe, you can make them into your ally for use during future battles. You can take up to two monsters with you on your treks into Idea, selecting from eventually over 100 beasts.

External links
Coded Soul Information
Game Trailer Interview
IGN Article

2008 video games
Action role-playing video games
PlayStation Portable games
PlayStation Portable-only games
Sony Interactive Entertainment games
Video games scored by Hitoshi Sakimoto
Video games scored by Masaharu Iwata
Video games developed in Japan